Big Pine Mountain is a mountain located in the San Rafael Mountains of the California Transverse Ranges. High enough to receive snowfall during the winter,
The summit, at 6800+ feet (2,074+ m), is the highest point in the San Rafael Mountains, the Dick Smith Wilderness, and Santa Barbara County. The peak and the surrounding area were severely impacked by the Zaca fire in 2007.

See also 
 Los Padres National Forest
 List of highest points in California by county

References 

Mountains of Santa Barbara County, California
San Rafael Mountains
Los Padres National Forest
Mountains of Southern California